Hugh Barter (born 15 September 2005) is an Australian-Japanese racing driver who is currently racing in the 2023 FIA Formula 3 Championship for Campos Racing. He previously competed in both the Spanish F4 and French F4 Championship, finishing runner-up in the 2021 French F4 Championship, the 2022 French F4 Championship and the 2022 F4 Spanish Championship respectively.

Career

Karting 
After starting to race in karts at the age of six, Barter progressed into national competitions, where he came second in the Australian Kart Championship in 2019 and won the opening round of the 2020 season, prior to the season being abandoned due to the COVID-19 pandemic. He also competed in the Rotax Max Challenge Grand Finals on two occasions, where he achieved eighth and ninth places in 2016 and 2019 respectively.

Lower formulae

2021 
Barter began racing in cars in 2021, having signed up for the French F4 Championship. The first round at Nogaro brought immediate success, as the Australian took victory on Sunday, whilst the following event at Magny-Cours herolded a triple of podiums, bringing Barter into the championship fight. However, the middle part of the season would not yield the strongest results, with just two podiums coming his way in the space of four rounds, which meant that Barter had lost a lot of ground to fellow contenders Esteban Masson and Macéo Capietto going into the season finale. There, Barter showed some more good form, scoring a pair of podiums in the main races, and after a disqualification for Capietto, Barter inherited the win of the final race, which put him second in the standings.

2022 
For the 2022 season, Barter opted to remain in Formula 4, citing his lack of pole positions and their importance in higher-level championships, such as Formula Regional, as a main reason for him to stay in the category. The Australian remained in French F4, whilst also competing for Campos Racing in the F4 Spanish Championship. In the latter, Barter started his campaign out strongly, being victorious in the season opener at Portimão. After this however, teammate Nikola Tsolov would become the dominant force within the championship, leading Barter to only take one podium from the subsequent two rounds. He would experience a more successful weekend at Spa-Francorchamps, finishing second in all three races to Tsolov, cementing himself in second place overall. At the next round in Aragón, Barter would add to his tally with two victories, as well as a third place in Race 2, before taking a hattrick of wins at Navarra, where he also took a pair of pole positions. By this stage, Tsolov had been crowned as the champion, with Barter ending his season by scoring two further podiums at Barcelona, securing himself the runner-up spot.

In the latter championship, the Australian proved his experience within the category by taking pole position for and winning the main races in Nogaro, before following that up with a win at the tricky Pau Circuit, taking the overall lead which he extended with another podium in Race 3 on the same weekend. Throughout the next four events, Barter would win seven races and take two more podiums in a dominant display at Lédenon, but he would be hindered from taking any points from the weekends at Spa and Valencia, as he had competed at those tracks during his Spanish F4 campaign, which meant that the Australian went into the season finale with a 32-point deficit to Alessandro Giusti. An early retirement in Race 1 meant an end for Barter's title ambitions, as, despite taking another podium on Sunday, he finished second in the championship.

FIA Formula 3 Championship 
In late September, Barter partook in the FIA Formula 3 post-season test with Campos Racing during the second and third days. In January 2023, Campos announced that Barter had signed with the team for the full 2023 season.

Personal life 
Barter was born in Nagoya to a Japanese mother and Australian father and grew up in Melbourne.

Karting record

Karting career summary 

‡ The championship was cancelled after two rounds due to the COVID-19 pandemic.

Racing record

Racing career summary 

* Season still in progress.

Complete French F4 Championship results 
(key) (Races in bold indicate pole position) (Races in italics indicate fastest lap)

Complete F4 Spanish Championship results 
(key) (Races in bold indicate pole position) (Races in italics indicate fastest lap)

Complete FIA Formula 3 Championship results 
(key) (Races in bold indicate pole position) (Races in italics indicate points for the fastest lap of top ten finishers)

References

External links 

2005 births
Living people
Sportspeople from Nagoya
Australian racing drivers
French F4 Championship drivers
Campos Racing drivers
Spanish F4 Championship drivers
FIA Formula 3 Championship drivers